Tingena aphrontis is a species of moth in the family Oecophoridae. It is endemic to New Zealand and has been collected at altitudes between 3000 - 5000 ft at Arthur's Pass and Mount Arthur. The species lives in open alpine habitat amongst alpine vegetation. Adults of the species are on the wing in January.

Taxonomy 
This species was described by Edward Meyrick in 1883 using specimens collected at Arthur's Pass at 5000 ft in January and named Cremnogenes aphrontis. Meyrick gave a more detailed description under this name in 1884. In 1915 Meyrick placed this species within the Borkhausenia genus. George Hudson illustrated and discussed this species under the name B. aphrontis in his 1928 publication The butterflies and moths of New Zealand. In 1988 J. S. Dugdale placed this species in the genus Tingena. The male lectotype, collected at Arthur's Pass, is held at the Natural History Museum, London.

Description

Meyrick first described this species as follows:

In 1884 Meyrick went into more detail, describing this species as follows:
This species is variable as the grey coloured patches are sometimes absent in some specimens.

Distribution
It is endemic to New Zealand and has been collected at Mount Arthur and at Arthur's pass at altitudes of between 3000 - 5000 ft.

Behaviour 
This species is on the wing in January.

Habitat 

This species lives in open alpine habitat amongst alpine vegetation such as grass and herbs.

References

Oecophoridae
Moths of New Zealand
Moths described in 1883
Endemic fauna of New Zealand
Taxa named by Edward Meyrick
Endemic moths of New Zealand